The men's 5000 metres race of the 2013–14 ISU Speed Skating World Cup 2, arranged in the Utah Olympic Oval, in Salt Lake City, United States, was held on November 17, 2013.

All podium places were taken by Dutch skaters; Sven Kramer won the gold medal, while Bob de Jong and Jorrit Bergsma took the silver and bronze medals, respectively. Daniil Sinitsyn of Russia won the Division B race.

Results
The race took place on Sunday, November 17, with Division B scheduled in the morning session, at 08:40, and Division A scheduled in the afternoon session, at 14:54.

Division A

Division B

References

Men 5000
2